PHK may refer to:

Palm Beach County Glades Airport (IATA code)
Phosphorylase kinase, PhK, an enzyme
Poul-Henning Kamp, a Danish software developer
Para Hills Knights SC, an South Australian association football team